Fathallah, Fathalla or the Turkish variant Fethullah is a transliteration of the Arabic given name, فتح الله (Fatḥ Allāh), built from the Arabic words fath and Allah. It is one of many Arabic theophoric names, meaning "Allah's opening (God's opening)" or "God's conquest".

Given name

Fathallah
 Fathallah Oualalou, Moroccan politician
 Fathallah Saqqal (born 1898), Syrian attorney, writer and government minister
 Fathallah Sijilmassi, Moroccan politician and economist

Fethullah
 Fethullah Gülen (born 1941), Turkish preacher, former imam, writer and political figure. Founder of the Gülen movement (also known as Hizmet)

Surname
Hesham Fathallah (born 1990), Egyptian footballer
Mahmoud Fathalla, Egyptian footballer

Places
 Fathallah barracks, the early headquarters of the Hezbollah organisation
 Kalateh-ye Fathallah, a village in Shirin Su Rural District, Maneh District, Maneh and Samalqan County, North Khorasan Province, Iran

Other
 Fathallah Gomla Market, a supermarket chain in Egypt

References

Arabic masculine given names